Hell Is Here may refer to:

 Hell Is Here (album), 1999 album by the Crown
 "Hell Is Here" (song), 2022 single by Cryalot
 "Hell Is Here", song by Saves the Day from the album Sound the Alarm